Victor Attah International Airport , is an airport serving Uyo, the capital of Akwa Ibom State in Nigeria.

The Akwa Ibom non-directional beacon (Ident: AI) and Uyo VOR-DME (Ident: AKW) are located on the field.

The first phase of airport construction began in 2006 and was completed in the year 2009. Akwa Ibom Airport opened on September 23, 2009, and the first scheduled passenger service commenced on December 2, 2009, when Arik Air began offering flights to Abuja and Lagos. The second construction phase began in the year 2012, and included the completion of a maintenance, repair, and overhaul facility, the construction of an international terminal, and additional taxiways.

The airport was renamed after former Governor Obong Victor Attah by Governor Udom Emmanuel at a Banquet to honor the 80th birthday of Obong Attah on 24 November 2018, the airport which was previously named Akwa Ibom International Airport has now been renamed to Victor Attah International Airport.

Airlines and destinations

The airport also serves as the hub for CRJ900 operator, Ibom Air. Ibom Air is a state-owned carrier based at Victor Attah International Airport. The carrier operates regional services to destinations in Africa, using CRJ900 aircraft. The airline is wholly owned and operated by Akwa Ibom State Government.. Ibom air launched its maiden flight on 7 June 2019. The event was graced by the deputy governor, Moses Ekpo in company of other Akwa Ibomites. A Bombardier CRJ 900 Series with registration number 5N-BWM took off by 12pm for the Murtala Muhammed International Airport, Lagos. Ibom air took delivery of its first set of aircraft in the form of two Bombardier CRJ-900s. The Akwa Ibom State Government took delivery of the fourth aircraft in the fleet of Ibom Air on 19 May 2020. The Airline then took over two Airbus A220-300s from Air Sinai with an order for ten more to be delivered directly from Airbus. Ibom air now has seven aircraft in its fleet.

Infrastructure

MRO
Akwa Ibom International airport has a constructed Maintenance, Repair and Overhaul facility capable of handling aircraft maintenance and overhaul of heavy commercial aircraft. The facility can conduct the A, B, C and D check. The facility, specifically designed for the Boeing 747, can accommodate two Boeing 747-400 parked juxtaposed, nose-in, fully contained within the building. The facility equipment, arrangement, clearance and supporting workshops allow flexibility for servicing a wide range of commercial aircraft.

Runways
The airport has a 3.6 km runway with designation 03/21.

Operational facilities
The airport has a category 9 aircraft rescue and fire fighting facility, a category II instrument landing system, an air traffic control tower, a technical and administrative building, emergency operating centre, aviation fuel farm, health clinic, police station, perimeter roads and fencing.

Future expansion and plans
Akwa Ibom International airport has plans for expansion. There are plans to build a cargo terminal with an accompanying apron, a permanent international passenger terminal building, a 3 to 5 star airport hotel capable of handling 2 simultaneous cancelled flights and pilgrims destined for Jerusalem, an aviation training college and other aviation facilities.
The permanent terminal will feature facilities for flexible dual use, such that it would serve both domestic and international flights. It will have arrival and departure halls for domestic and international flights with the routes split, which will be efficient for both passenger and baggage movement. While departing passengers arrive at an elevated forecourt and move down a ramp to a boarding aircraft, arriving passengers move downwards to baggage reclaim facilities.

Terminals

Terminal 1
Terminal 1 opened in September 2009 to cater to flights at the airport. The terminal has check-in facilities and a ticketing section for departing passengers. It is also equipped with full body scanners and a departure lounge; departing passengers at the lounge can relax at the light restaurant until boarding is announced. The terminal has a baggage reclaim facility for arriving passengers. Passport control and customs are only available for international flights. The terminal serves Arik Air, Aero Contractors, Dana Air, Air Peace and charter airlines such as Sky Airlines, Atlasjet Airlines flying to Tel Aviv.

See also
Transport in Nigeria
List of airports in Nigeria

References

External links
OurAirports - Uyo
OpenStreetMap - Akwa Ibom

Airports in Nigeria
Akwa Ibom State
Buildings and structures in Uyo